Dirk Jacoby (born 21 March 1962) is a German former water polo player. He competed in the men's tournament at the 1988 Summer Olympics.

References

External links
 

1962 births
Living people
German male water polo players
Olympic water polo players of West Germany
Water polo players at the 1988 Summer Olympics
People from Kamen
Sportspeople from Arnsberg (region)